Vladimir (Lado) Asatiani (14 January 1917 – 23 June 1943) was a Georgian poet. His poetic career, lasting only for seven years, made him one of the best-loved Georgian poets of the 20th century.

Lado Asatiani was born in Kutaisi, on January 14, 1917, into a family of teachers. He received his secondary education in his native village Bardnala. He successfully graduated from Tsageri Agricultural Technique and became a student of Kutaisi Pedagogical Institute. In 1983 he left Pedagogical Institute. There he was introduced to and became a friend of George Napetvaridze. First poem “თებერვლის დილა” was published in 1936 in Kutaisi"s newspaper  Stalineli. The mother of poet Lida Tskitishvili was teaching Georgian language.  She was arrested because of someone’s denunciation, was taken to Siberia and died in a foreign country. When Lado Asatiani’s first poem was published, he sent his mother the newspaper. At that time, the poet's mother was already dying. The first time she wasn't given the newspaper, but after requesting of Georgian prisoners, they read her son’s poem to Lida.

Since 1938 Lado moved to work and to live in Tbilisi and began working in the newspaper "ნორჩი ლენინელი", which was located opposite the opera. During this time he met his future wife Aniko Vachnadze, who worked as  an economist in the writer’s union.  At first, Lado met Aniko by chance in the street and sent a letter of anonymous love.  In Aniko’s job writers decided to appear author of letter by handwriting.  Finally, Revaz Margiani guessed that the author was Lado Asatiani. The love letter was torn to pieces by Aniko and because of this she was very worried.

Aniko Vachnadze was one of the most beautiful girls. Before meeting Lado Asatiani, Simon Chikovani, Paolo Iashvili, Valerian Gafrindashvili, George Shatberashvili, Kolau Nadiradze, George Kuchishvili, Sergei Mixalkovi were devoted to Aniko poems.  Later, all these poems were marked by Asatiani.

After their first meeting, Lado Asatiani and Aniko Vachnadze got married in several days. They were introduced each other by close friend Nika Agiashvili. After marriage, first they lived at Aniko’s  parents’ house, after they moved to Dzerzhinski Street, in a small room with no windows. Its dwelling-space was only 14 square meters. The room had a glass on the door and the light of day was coming from this way.

The poet got sick as an adult with tuberculosis. At this time consumption was incurable. When he felt bad, he was going to Abastumani. After feeling a little bit well he returned to Tbilisi. He could not walk on the upgrade, so his wife rented a room in hotel “Orient”. Their window was in front of the Lado Gudiashvili’s house. One day the poet told how much he wanted to be his book decorated by Lado Gudiashvili. Aniko told this story to Lado Gudiashvili’s wife. The poet's dream came true, but only after his death. When he died Lado Gudiashvili painted Asatiani’s portrait on the poet’s book.

In the heart of Tbilisi, there is one of the eldest street of the city, which was named after Lado Asatiani. The street is full of ancient buildings and it's one of the main sightseeing for the foreigner visitors and not only. On the street you can find small bars and restaurants, wine shops and art galleries, designer's corners and vintage stores. such as: Process Bar (Lado Asatiani #33); Tsitska Wine Shop (Lado Asatiani #34); Buyer's Shop and many other.

References

External links

1917 births
1943 deaths
Burials at Didube Pantheon
People from Kutaisi
People from Kutais Governorate
Male poets from Georgia (country)
20th-century deaths from tuberculosis
20th-century poets from Georgia (country)
20th-century male writers
Tuberculosis deaths in Georgia (country)
Tuberculosis deaths in the Soviet Union
Soviet poets